BT Broadband is a broadband service offered by BT Consumer; a division of BT Group in the United Kingdom. It was formerly known as BT Total Broadband, BT Yahoo! Broadband and BT Openworld. With the introduction of BT Infinity, the Broadband package now refers to the legacy ADSL broadband products, such as ADSL Max and ADSL2+.

BT Home Hub 

The BT Home Hub is a wireless Internet router from BT. It is based on the IEEE 802.11g (WiFi) standard and also supports IEEE 802.11b devices. It is significant as it marks BTs departure away from traditional telecommunications services and towards Internet and media products. It supports VoIP Internet calls and is compatible with existing DECT handsets. It works with the existing BT Fusion service and works with the BT Vision video on demand service. The device connects to the Internet using a standard ADSL connection. It will be able to support the WBC products using ADSL2+ (up to 24Mb) when BT Wholesale launches them in April 2008.
BT launched a new look Home Hub in October 2007 with an enhanced wireless footprint. In July 2008 the Home Hub was relaunched with a new smaller design, Draft-N wireless, additional connections and a new user interface; unlike the previous replacement, the new Home Hub was given a .0 release, making it the Home Hub 2.0.

BT Infinity 

In January 2010, BT launched a new product called BT Infinity. 4 million homes in the UK are covered by this service. Most homes will get FTTC service and have up to 40Mbit/s broadband, those with FTTP will get 100Mbit/s and a 20GB monthly usage allowance in 2010, with an unlimited package also offered. BT have since rolled out Infinity 2 offering up to 79Mbit/s download and 19 Mbit/s upload with an unlimited package. Infinity customers are allowed to upgrade to Infinity 2, but must restart their 18-month contract.

See also 
 BT Group
 BT Infinity
 BT TV

References

External links 
BT vs Talktalk Broadband

BT Group
Internet service providers of the United Kingdom
Broadband
Yahoo! co-branded ISPs